Bartoszówka may refer to the following places in Poland:
Bartoszówka, Lower Silesian Voivodeship (south-west Poland)
Bartoszówka, Łódź Voivodeship (central Poland)
Bartoszówka, Masovian Voivodeship (east-central Poland)